Paul Majunke (1842, Groß-Schmograu – 1899) was a Catholic priest, journalist and Reichstag deputy.

References

1842 births
1897 deaths
People from Wołów County
People from the Province of Silesia
19th-century German Roman Catholic priests
Centre Party (Germany) politicians
Members of the 2nd Reichstag of the German Empire
Members of the 3rd Reichstag of the German Empire
Members of the 4th Reichstag of the German Empire
Members of the 5th Reichstag of the German Empire